Nurscia is a genus of spiders in the family Titanoecidae. It is a relatively widespread genus with species being found in both Europe and Asia.

Species
 Nurscia albofasciata (Strand, 1907) — Russia, China, Korea, Taiwan, Japan
 Nurscia albomaculata (Lucas, 1846) — Europe to Central Asia
 Nurscia albosignata Simon, 1874 — Bulgaria, Cyprus to Central Asia
 Nurscia sequerai (Simon, 1892) — Portugal to France

References 

Titanoecidae
Araneomorphae genera
Spiders of Europe
Spiders of Asia